The Panama national rugby union team represents Panama in rugby union. They are nicknamed the "Diablos Rojos" (Red Devils).

History

Panama's first international match was in 2005, in Ciudad de Panama, Panama, against the Costa Rica national rugby union team, which they lost 60-0. At this time there were no names to represent the rugby selection of Panama as an official team. This team that played against Costa Rica during this year of 2005 no longer exists.

In December 2006, Panama, represented now by an official rugby club named Diablos Rojos Rugby Club of Panama (D.R.R.C of Panama), played against the Law School Veterans team of Universidad Complutense de Madrid (Madrid, Spain) at Balboa Stadium, located in Ancon, Ciudad de Panama. The result of this game was 14-12 to the Madrid team.

Panama were accepted into, and hosted, the CONSUR Mayor C tournament.

See also
 Rugby union in Panama

References
 Panama rugby statistics
Diablos Rojos Rugby Club de Panama
Heaven's Game, Diablos Rojos Panama Rugby's Lonely Star

External links
 

Rugby union in Panama
Central American national rugby union teams
Rugby